The Stray is a 2017 American drama family film directed by Mitch Davis and written by Mitch and Parker Davis. The film stars Michael Cassidy and Sarah Lancaster.

Plot 
A young father takes his nine-year-old son, the family dog, and two of his son's friends backpacking in the mountains of Colorado only for all five of them to be struck by lightning. The story of how a stray dog, Pluto, comes out of nowhere and impacts the Davis family, who are struggling in many ways. In just a short time, Pluto the Wonderdog manages to save a toddler, bring comfort and companionship to a hurting 9-year-old boy, help restore a marriage, and repair a broken father-son relationship. Pluto is not only a guard dog - he is a guardian angel.

Cast 
Michael Cassidy as Mitch Davis
Sarah Lancaster as Michelle Davis
Connor Corum as Christian Davis; Corum's first acting role was in Heaven Is for Real (2014)
Jacque Gray as Misty Davis
Enoch Ellis as Clark LaCouture
Brennin Williams as Justin 'Smitty' Smith
Scott Christopher as Dave Smith
Shiloh as Pluto

Reception 
The Stray received negative reviews from critics. On review aggregator Rotten Tomatoes, the film has a rating of 40%, based on 10 reviews, with an average rating of 5.1/10.

Sheri Linden of the Los Angeles Times stated, "The drama preceding that real-life footage, is an underpowered, white-bread sermon on the importance of family and faith". Sandie Angulo Chen of Common Sense Media rated the film 2 out of 5 stars stating, "Faith-based family drama could distress dog lovers". Roger Moore of Movie Nation gave the film 1.5 stars out of 4 stating, "The Stray never rises to the level of maudlin".

References

External links

2017 drama films
American drama films
Films set in Colorado
2010s English-language films
2010s American films